Le Chatelier can refer to:

 Alfred Le Chatelier (1855–1929), French soldier, explorer and professor
 Bénédicte Le Chatelier (born 1976), French television journalist
 Henry Louis Le Chatelier, 19th-century chemist
 Le Châtelier's principle, named after Henry Louis
 Louis Le Chatelier, 19th-century chemist and industrialist, father of Henri Louis
 Le Châtelier, a commune in the Marne département, France